The Maslach Burnout Inventory (MBI) is a psychological assessment instrument comprising 22 symptom items pertaining to occupational burnout. The original form of the MBI was developed by Christina Maslach and Susan E. Jackson with the goal of assessing an individual's experience of burnout. As underlined by Schaufeli (2003), a major figure of burnout research, "the MBI is neither grounded in firm clinical observation nor based on sound theorising. Instead, it has been developed inductively by factor-analysing a rather arbitrary set of items" (p. 3). The instrument takes 10 minutes to complete. The MBI measures three dimensions of burnout: emotional exhaustion, depersonalization, and personal accomplishment.

Following the publication of the MBI in 1981, new versions of the MBI were gradually developed to apply to different groups and different settings. There are now five versions of the MBI: Human Services Survey (MBI-HSS), Human Services Survey for Medical Personnel (MBI-HSS (MP)), Educators Survey (MBI-ES), General Survey (MBI-GS), and General Survey for Students (MBI-GS [S]).

Two meta-analyses of primary studies that report sample-specific reliability estimates for the three MBI scales found that emotional exhaustion scale has good enough reliability; however, reliability is problematic regarding depersonalization and personal accomplishment scales. Research based on the job demands-resources (JD-R) model indicates that the emotional exhaustion, the core of burnout, is directly related to demands and inversely related to the extensiveness of resources. The MBI has been validated for human services populations, educator populations, and general work populations.

The MBI is often combined with the Areas of Worklife Survey (AWS) to assess levels of burnout and worklife context.

Uses of the Maslach Burnout Inventory 
 Assess professional burnout in human service, education, business, and government professions.
 Assess and validate the three-dimensional structure of burnout.
 Understand the nature of burnout for developing effective interventions.

Maslach Burnout Inventory Scales

Emotional Exhaustion (EE) 
The 9-item Emotional Exhaustion (EE) scale measures feelings of being emotionally overextended and exhausted by one's work. Higher scores correspond to greater experienced burnout. This scale is used in the MBI-HSS, MBI-HSS (MP), and MBI-ES versions.

The MBI-GS and MBI-GS (S) use a shorter 5-item version of this scale called "Exhaustion".

Depersonalization (DP) 
The 5-item Depersonalization (DP) scale measures an unfeeling and impersonal response toward recipients of one's service, care, treatment, or instruction. Higher scores indicate higher degrees of experienced burnout. This scale is used in the MBI-HSS, MBI-HSS (MP) and the MBI-ES versions.

Personal Accomplishment (PA) 
The 8-item Personal Accomplishment (PA) scale measures feelings of competence and successful achievement in one's work. Lower scores correspond to greater experienced burnout. This scale is used in the MBI-HSS, MBI-HSS (MP), and MBI-ES versions.

Cynicism 
The 5-item Cynicism scale measures an indifference or a distance attitude towards one's work. It is akin to the Depersonalization scale. The cynicism measured by this scale is a coping mechanism for distancing oneself from exhausting job demands. Higher scores correspond to greater experienced burnout. This scale is used in the MBI-GS and MBI-GS (S) versions.

Professional Efficacy 
The 6-item Professional Efficacy scale measures feelings of competence and successful achievement in one's work. It is akin to the Personal Accomplishment scale. This sense of personal accomplishment emphasizes effectiveness and success in having a beneficial impact on people. Lower scores correspond to greater experienced burnout. This scale is used in the MBI-GS and MBI-GS (S) versions.

Forms of the Maslach Burnout Inventory 
The MBI has five validated forms composed of 16-22 items to measure an individual's experience of burnout.

Maslach Burnout Inventory - Human Services Survey (MBI-HSS) 
The MBI-HSS consists of 22 items and is the original and most widely used version of the MBI. It was designed for professionals in human services and is appropriate for respondents working in a diverse array of occupations, including nurses, physicians, health aides, social workers, health counselors, therapists, police, correctional officers, clergy, and other fields focused on helping people live better lives by offering guidance, preventing harm, and ameliorating physical, emotional, or cognitive problems. The MBI-HSS scales are Emotional Exhaustion, Depersonalization, and Personal Accomplishment.

Maslach Burnout Inventory - Human Services Survey for Medical Personnel (MBI-HSS (MP)) 
The MBI-HSS (MP) is a variation of the MBI-HSS adapted for medical personnel. The most notable alteration is this form refers to "patients" instead of "recipients". The MBI-HSS (MP) scales are Emotional Exhaustion, Depersonalization, and Personal Accomplishment.

Maslach Burnout Inventory - Educators Survey (MBI-ES) 
The MBI-ES consists of 22 items and is a version of the original MBI for use with educators. It was designed for teachers, administrators, other staff members, and volunteers working in any educational setting. This form was formerly known as MBI-Form Ed. The MBI-ES scales are Emotional Exhaustion, Depersonalization, and Personal Accomplishment.

Maslach Burnout Inventory - General Survey (MBI-GS) 
The MBI-GS consists of 16 items and is designed for use with occupational groups other than human services and education, including those working in jobs such as customer service, maintenance, manufacturing, management, and most other professions. The MBI-GS scales are Exhaustion, Cynicism, and Professional Efficacy.

Maslach Burnout Inventory - General Survey for Students (MBI-GS (S)) 
The MBI-GS (S) is an adaptation of the MBI-GS designed to assess burnout in college and university students. It is available for use but its psychometric properties are not yet documented. The MBI-GS (S) scales are Exhaustion, Cynicism, and Professional Efficacy.

Scoring the Maslach Burnout Inventory 
All MBI items are scored using a 7 level frequency ratings from "never" to "daily." The MBI has three component scales: emotional exhaustion (9 items), depersonalization (5 items) and personal achievement (8 items). Each scale measures its own unique dimension of burnout. Scales should not be combined to form a single burnout scale. Importantly, the recommendation of examining the three dimensions of burnout separately implies that, in practice, the MBI is a measure of three independent constructs - emotional exhaustion, depersonalization, and personal accomplishment - rather than a measure of burnout. Maslach, Jackson, and Leiter described item scoring from 0 to 6. There are score ranges that define low, moderate and high levels of each scale based on the 0-6 scoring.

The 7-level frequency scale for all MBI scales is as follows:
 Never (0)
 A few times a year or less (1)
 Once a month or less (2)
 A few times a month (3)
 Once a week (4)
 A few times a week (5)
 Every day (6)

Examples of use
The Maslach Burnout Inventory has been used in a variety of studies to study burnout, including with health professionals and teachers.

Notes

References 

Psychological tests and scales
Human resource management
Occupational stress
Organizational theory
Workplace
Motivation
Organizational behavior